ATATool is freeware software that is used to display and modify ATA disk information from a Microsoft Windows environment. The software is typically used to manage host protected area (HPA) and device configuration overlay (DCO) features and is broadly similar to the hdparm for Linux. The software can also be used to generate and sometimes repair bad sectors. Recent versions include support for DCO restore and freeze operations, HPA security (password) operations and simulated bad sectors.

Usage examples 
ATATool must be run with administrator privileges. On Windows Vista and later it requires an elevated-privileges command prompt (see User Account Control). The target drive must be connected to a physical disk controller. The software cannot be used via a USB bridge or similar device.

Display detected hard disks:
 ATATOOL /LIST

Display information on hard disk 1:
 ATATOOL /INFO \\.\PhysicalDrive1

Set HPA to 10GB on hard disk 1 (volatile – will be lost on next power cycle):
 ATATOOL /SETHPA:10GB \\.\PhysicalDrive1

Set HPA to 10GB on hard disk 1 (non-volatile):
 ATATOOL /NONVOLATILEHPA /SETHPA:10GB \\.\PhysicalDrive1

Remove HPA to 10GB on hard disk 1 (non-volatile):
 ATATOOL /NONVOLATILEHPA /RESETHPA \\.\PhysicalDrive1

Set DCO to 5GB on hard disk 1:
 ATATOOL /SETDCO:5GB \\.\PhysicalDrive1

Remove DCO on hard disk 1:
 ATATOOL /RESTOREDCO:5GB \\.\PhysicalDrive1

Make sector 10 bad:
 ATATOOL /BADECC:10 \\.\PhysicalDrive1

Make sector 10 not bad:
 ATATOOL /FIXECC:10 \\.\PhysicalDrive1

Make sector 10 bad and then not bad again (alternative method):
 ATATOOL /BADECCLONG:10 \\.\PhysicalDrive1
 ATATOOL /FIXECCLONG:10 \\.\PhysicalDrive1

Data safety
Use of the ATATool can permanently change the disk configuration, may result in permanent data loss by making some sectors of the disk inaccessible. The tool should therefore be used with extreme care.

See also
 hdparm
 Host protected area (HPA)
 Device configuration overlay (DCO)

References

External links
 ATATool

AT Attachment
Computer forensics